The 2010 Meteor Music Awards ceremony took place on Friday 19 February 2010 in Dublin. They were presented by Amanda Byram. The launch took place in La Stampa on 7 January 2010, and was attended by The Coronas and Danny O'Donoghue from The Script.

Bell X1, Christy Moore, Florence and the Machine and U2 each received three nominations. U2 received no awards to the surprise of The Coronas and The Script who beat them in two of the three categories. Westlife won Best Irish Pop Act for the tenth consecutive year. The list of performing artists on the night included international acts such as Dizzee Rascal, Pixie Lott, Paolo Nutini, The Script, The Temper Trap and Westlife. Snow Patrol were also announced but later cancelled their scheduled performance.

The event had sold out by early February. It was broadcast on RTÉ Two on 21 February 2010, at 21:00.

Performances
The first announcements were:

 The Coronas
 Florence and the Machine
 Pixie Lott
 Paolo Nutini
 The Script
 Snow Patrol
 Westlife

Later announcements included:

 Brian Kennedy and the Dublin Gospel Choir
 Bell X1
 The Temper Trap
 Dizzee Rascal

Cancelled performance
Snow Patrol announced an inability to perform at the 2010 Meteor Awards after frontman Gary Lightbody broke his jaw.

Winners and nominees
The nominations were announced on January 7, 2010.

Public voting categories

Best Radio DJ – National
 Ray Foley – Today FM
 Ian Dempsey – Today FM
 Damien Farrelly – RTÉ 2fm
 Tony Fenton – Today FM
 Larry Gogan – RTÉ 2fm
 Dan Hegarty – RTÉ 2fm

Best Radio DJ – Regional
 Leigh Doyle – BEAT
 Jim & Niamh – FM104
 KC & Lenny – Red FM
 Michelle McMahon – Spin South West
 Jon Richards – Galway Bay FM
 Shona Ryan – SPIN 1038

Best Irish Band
 Snow Patrol
 Bell X1
 The Coronas
 Delorentos
 U2

Best Irish Male
 Christy Moore
 Colin Devlin
 Jerry Fish
 Jack L
 Mundy

Best Irish Female
 Wallis Bird
 Julie Feeney
 Valerie Francis
 Laura Izibor
 Dolores O'Riordan

Best Irish Pop Act
 Westlife
 Delorentos
 Laura Izibor
 The Blizzards
 The Script

Best Irish Album
 The Coronas – Tony Was an Ex-Con
 Bell X1 – Blue Lights on the Runway
 The Duckworth Lewis Method – The Duckworth Lewis Method
 Snow Patrol – Up to Now
 U2 – No Line on the Horizon

Best Irish Live Performance
 The Script – Oxegen 2009
 Bell X1
 Christy Moore
 Snow Patrol
 U2

Non-Public voting categories

Best Folk/Traditional
 Sharon Shannon
 Kathleen Loughnane
 Kíla with Bruno Coulais
 Christy Moore
 Mairéad Ní Mhaonaigh

Best International Band
 Florence and the Machine
 The Black Eyed Peas
 Green Day
 Kasabian
 Muse

Best International Male
 Michael Bublé
 Jay Z
 Morrissey
 Paolo Nutini
 Bruce Springsteen

Best International Female
 Lady Gaga
 Lily Allen
 Little Boots
 Pixie Lott
 Taylor Swift

Best International Album
 Paolo Nutini – Sunny Side Up
 Kasabian – West Ryder Pauper Lunatic Asylum
 Florence and the Machine – Lungs
 Mumford & Sons – Sigh No More
 Lady Gaga – The Fame Monster

Best International Live Performance
 Leonard Cohen
 Coldplay
 Florence and the Machine
 Bruce Springsteen
 Take That

Special awards

Lifetime achievement award
 Brian Kennedy

Humanitarian Award
 Niall Mellon

Industry Award
 The Marquess Conyngham, organiser of the concerts at Slane Castle.
Presented by Adam Clayton

Most Promising New Artist of the Year
As part of the 2010 Meteor Ireland Music Awards organisers developed a new award called Most Promising New Artist of 2010. This new award was designed for any up-and-coming artist or band who were unsigned. The award itself is differentiated from the Hope of 2010 award in that the Hope award is given to an artist or band already signed to a mainstream or independent record label. An artist or band who would like to be part of the Most Promising New Artist of 2010 nominations had to submit relevant particulars before January 11, 2010. The winner of the award is expected to perform at the event, appear at Oxegen 2010 and have 150 copies of their debut single released, including artwork.

Nominations announced on February 5, 2010:

 Amasis
 Ever27
 Jody Has A Hitlist
 Colm Lynch
 Susie Soho
 Three Plus Me

Multiple nominations
Bell X1, Christy Moore, Florence and the Machine (from the UK), Snow Patrol and U2 received three nominations each.

 3 nominations
 Bell X1
 Christy Moore
 Florence and the Machine
 Snow Patrol
 U2

 2 nominations
 Bruce Springsteen
 The Coronas
 Delorentos
 Kasabian
 Lady Gaga
 Laura Izibor
 Paolo Nutini

References

External links
 Official site
 MCD Promotions
 List of winners through the years
 2010 photos at Hot Press
 "Meteor Awards – No Fun(derland)": Review by Sophie Elizabeth Smith

Meteor Music Awards
Meteor Awards